Chromodoris barnardi is a species of colourful sea slug, a dorid nudibranch, a marine gastropod mollusc in the family Chromodorididae.

Distribution
This species was described from Makung harbour, west of Taiwan.

References

Chromodorididae
Gastropods described in 1868